This is a list of political parties in the Autonomous Administration of North and East Syria. The Autonomous Administration of North and East Syria has a political system based on  direct democratic and multi-party aspirations, with different levels of government: Self-governing municipalities and communes, self-governing autonomous regions and provinces, and the autonomous region as a whole.

There have been two elections in the region so far, one for the communes/municipalities and one for regions/provinces in 2017, while the third federation-level election for the Syrian Democratic Council was delayed.

Political parties in Rojava

Parties 

The following parties are represented either in the Syrian Democratic Assembly as of September 2016 or in cantonal parliaments:

Notes: * including independents

Minor parties 
The following groups or parties are not represented at either the cantonal or federal level (but may hold positions in municipal parliaments).

Relative importance of the five party alliances

Historical parties and alliances

Historical parties

Historical alliances

Names in the national languages

See also
 Politics of Syria
 List of political parties by country

Notes

Bibliography

References

External links
Syrian Democratic Assembly